The 17th IAAF World Indoor Championships was held from 1 to 4 March 2018 in Birmingham, United Kingdom. This was the city's second hosting of the event as it previously did so in 2003.

Bidding process
Birmingham bid for the 2016 IAAF World Indoor Championships as well as the 2018 event. Portland was selected unanimously to host the 2016 event with Birmingham being the only other bidder. With Portland then out of the running for the 2018 event Birmingham was selected as the host of the 2018 event. The reason Portland was selected for 2016 and Birmingham for 2018 is that the IAAF wanted more time between events in the UK with London hosting the 2012 Summer Olympics as well as the 2017 World Championships in Athletics along with Cardiff hosting the 2016 IAAF World Half Marathon Championships. Portland would become the beginning of a similar sequence for the US, with the 2021 World Championships in Eugene, Oregon and the 2028 Summer Olympics in Los Angeles.

Venue
The event took place at the National Indoor Arena with seating for 8,000 spectators.

Schedule

All dates are GMT (UTC±0)

Entry standards
The qualification period for all events runs from 1 January 2017 to 19 February 2018 (midnight Monaco time), except for the Combined Events where the qualification period runs from 1 January 2017 to 31 December 2017 and the five best athletes from the 2018 Indoor Lists (as at 12 February 2018). Twelve athletes will be invited in the Heptathlon and in the Pentathlon as follows: the winner of the 2017 Combined Events Challenge. One athlete which may be invited at the discretion of the IAAF. In total no more than two male and two female athletes from any one Member will be invited. Upon refusals or cancellations, the invitations shall be extended to the next ranked athletes in the same lists respecting the above conditions.

Medal summary

Men

Note: * = Relay athletes who only ran in heats

Women

Medal table

Notes
 IAAF does not include the three medals (2 gold, 1 silver) won by athletes competing as Authorised Neutral Athletes in their official medal table.

Participating nations
In brackets the number of athletes participating.

 (1)
 (1)
 (1)
 (1)
 (1)
 (7)
 (4)
 Authorised Neutral Athletes (7)
 (1)
 (5)
 (1)
 (8)
 (5)
 (1)
 (1)
 (1)
 (7)
 (1)
 (5)
 (1)
 (3)
 (1)
 (15)
 (1)
 (1)
 (13)
 (1)
 (1)
 (2)
 (2)
 (8)
 (1)
 (21)
 (1)
 (3)
 (1)
 (5)
 (1)
 (1)
 (2)
 (9)
 (1)
 (1)
 (3)
 (10)
 (1)
 (22)
 (2)
 (1)
 (30)
 (9)
 (3)
 (1)
 (1)
 (1)
 (1)
 (5)
 (1)
 (1)
 (1)
 (1)
 (5)
 (12)
 (5)
 (23)
 (1)
 (1)
 (5)
 (8)
 (1)
 (2)
 (1)
 (4)
 (1)
 (2)
 (1)
 (1)
 (1)
 (1)
 (1)
 (1)
 (1)
 (1)
 (1)
 (1)
 (6)
 (1)
 (1)
 (8)
 (4)
 (1)
 (4)
 (1)
 (3)
 (1)
 (1)
 (1)
 (1)
 (1)
 (26)
 (8)
 (1)
 (3)
 (4)
 (1)
 (2)
 (1)
 (1)
 (1)
 (2)
 (4)
 (1)
 (1)
 (3)
 (2)
 (1)
 (1)
 (5)
 (1)
 (16)
 (1)
 (14)
 (5)
 (1)
 (12)
 (1)
 (1)
 (13)
 (53)
 (1)
 (1)
 (1)
 (2)
 (1)

Disqualifications
This championship was notable for the large number of disqualifications, primarily lane violations (IAAF rule 163.3(a)). One entire heat of the Men's 400 metres was disqualified, a World Championship first. Some athletes appeared to have difficulty with the steep banking of the track. Accusations were raised about the heavy handedness of the officiating and inconsistencies relative to similar acts committed by star British athletes at the 2017 Outdoor World Championships held in London just 5 and a half months earlier.

References

External links
Official website
IAAF website
Statistics Handbook

 
World Athletics Indoor Championships
IAAF
2018 in English sport
World Indoor Championships
International athletics competitions hosted by England
2010s in Birmingham, West Midlands
Sports competitions in Birmingham, West Midlands